Saray-Chekurcha may refer to:
Saray-Chekurcha, Republic of Tatarstan, a village (selo) in the Republic of Tatarstan, Russia
Zheleznodorozhnogo razyezda Saray-Chekurcha, a settlement in the Republic of Tatarstan, Russia